John Anthony Feehan M.A., MSc, PhD, M.I.L.I. (born 12 May 1946) is an Irish geologist, botanist, author and broadcaster. He was born in Birr, County Offaly, Ireland. Feehan received his early education with the Presentation Brothers in Birr and the Salesian Fathers at Heywood. Following a number of years as a member of the Salesian Congregation including working as a teacher in England and Ireland, he studied Natural Sciences at Trinity College Dublin. After a year of voluntary teaching service in South Africa, he returned to Trinity College to study geology under Charles Hepworth Holland, receiving his PhD on the geology of the Slieve Bloom and Devilsbit Mountains in 1980. He was a Senior Lecturer in the School of Agriculture and Food Science at University College Dublin, where he taught for twenty years up to his retirement in 2012. In May 2021, he was made a member of the Royal Irish Academy. Feehan married Róisín Gilmore in 1975 and they have two children: Jane and Christiaan.

Commitment to public understanding of natural and cultural heritage 

Feehan is an environmental communicator whose work is driven by a deep commitment to the maintenance of rural biodiversity and cultural heritage, and the sustaining of rural community. He has written extensively on the natural and cultural heritage of the Irish landscape and on many broader aspects of environmental science. In 1986 and 1990 he wrote and presented the television series Exploring the Landscape and Tar Amach Faoin Aer / Exploring the Celtic Lands, produced by Éamon de Buitléar and directed by Paddy Breathnach, for which he received a Jacob's Television Award in 1988. He has been recognised by the Chartered Institute of Water and Environmental Management from whom he has received their Environmental Merit Award for involvement in environmental issues and his role in bringing to the attention of the public the importance of environmental heritage. He has also received a special award from Bord na Móna for his work in communicating environmental values.

Feehan teaches on a range of summer schools, field courses and postgraduate programmes, including the Offaly Naturalists' Field Club and at An Taiseach, the Dominican Ecology Centre in Wicklow.

Conservation and restoration of the Irish landscape 

Feehan is particularly well known as an interpreter of the Irish landscape (Feehan, 1979; 1984). He actively engages with agriculture and industry to build appreciation and understanding of biodiversity, and to develop conservation and restoration strategies. He is a strong advocate for community supported agriculture and integrated mixed farming as a means of maximising natural capital of land and sustaining rural community. His major work on Irish agriculture, "Farming in Ireland: History, Heritage and Environment" (2003) takes stock of the impacts of agricultural intensification of the last 50 years, evaluates the principal challenges facing Irish farming today, and presents a vision for the future.

Between 1992 and 2008 he collaborated with Bord na Móna on Ireland's peatland heritage. He has developed principles for the restoration of the country's post-extraction peatlands, emphasising their potential for biodiversity and as a rich amenity resource for local communities. This theme is developed in his authoritative The Bogs of Ireland: an introduction to the natural, cultural and industrial heritage of Irish peatlands (Feehan and O'Donovan, 1996, revised and reprinted in 2008).

Building on his work on restoration and management of peatland landscapes, Feehan has worked with mining and quarrying interests. His contribution has helped the extractive industries to comply with European best environmental practice.

The remarkable role of the potato in Irish agriculture – before, during, and since the Famine – is a particular interest of Feehan's. This is the subject of his contribution to the Atlas of the Great Irish Famine (2012), which was named Best Irish Published Book of the Year. In 2010, at a special ceremony, Feehan was awarded Honorary Membership of the Irish Landscape Institute www.irishlandscapeinsitute.com, the officially recognised professional body representing landscape architects and parks professionals in Ireland. 
He is also an Honorary Life Member of the Cork Geological Association and the County Kildare Archaeological Society.

Geology and botany 

During his research on the stratigraphy and palaeontology of the Irish Lower Palaeozoic in the 1970s, Feehan discovered what are still amongst the oldest known vascular plant fossils (Feehan and Edwards, 1980; Edwards, Feehan and Smith, 1983). These fossils indicated that higher plants colonised land at least 415 million years ago. The discovery extended the history of vascular plants back to the mid-Silurian period, far earlier than had previously been thought, a discovery that received international recognition.

His research interests later diversified to include pollination biology of tropical mistletoes (Loranthaceae) which he studied over a three-year period in Malawi (Feehan, 1985). More recently, his Grasses of Ireland (2012), produced in collaboration with Teagasc – 'an unexpectedly lovely and absorbing new book' – seeks both to inspire and to inform the reader about the most important plant family in agriculture which produces 70% of the crops we grow and is the principal food of many of our farm animals.

Currently, Feehan is building on his postgraduate research, interpreting new findings on the geology of the Irish midlands and relating this to broader cultural heritage. Aiming to inform and inspire the non-expert, his current work with Offaly County Council and the Heritage Council provides new insights, showing how geology is expressed in the landscapes and local life of counties Laois and Offaly. The resulting book 'The Geology of Laois and Offaly' (Feehan, 2013) has been described as 'one of the best books to be published in Ireland on geology or the Irish landscape'.

Environmental philosophy: Creation and the interface between religion and science 

Since 2010 he has devoted his attention to the interface between religion and science. His book on creation spirituality, The Singing Heart of the World (Feehan, 2010), was published in Dublin by Columba Press and in New York by Orbis Books in 2012. The book won a Nautilus Book Award in 2013 (category 'Science/Cosmology'). His book on creation spirituality, Every Bush Aflame: God in the Natural World is due for release by Veritas in Dublin.

The New Clare Island Survey 

One hundred years ago, Irish naturalist Robert Lloyd Praeger led a survey of the natural history and cultural heritage of Clare Island at a level of detail greater than any area of comparable size at that time. Almost a century later, the Royal Irish Academy set about repeating the exercise with the intention of assessing and evaluating change on the island over the intervening years. John Feehan was entrusted with the task of leading the synthesis of the updated Survey, bringing the work of Robert Lloyd Praeger into the 21st century and resulting in the landmark publication Clare Island (New Survey of Clare Island Volume 11) (Feehan, 2019).

Wildflowers films in the COVID-19 era 

In May 2020 John Feehan launched a new series of online films about Irish wildflowers, Wildflowers with John Feehan. Hosted by the Offaly County Council Heritage channel on YouTube, the series encompasses 50 species through the seasons, beginning with primrose and concluding with ivy. Each short film is an intimate and informative encounter with a chosen species, explaining the flower morphology, giving the pollinators' view of the flower, putting the species in its taxonomic context, and alluding to cultural and medicinal uses of the species. The series was initially launched to bring elements of Feehan's teaching online in response to the COVID-19 pandemic, but it has grown into a larger project with over 21,000 views of the films to date. A second series is planned for 2021.

Select bibliography 

Feehan, J., 1979. The Landscape of Slieve Bloom: a study of its natural and human heritage. Blackwater Press, Dublin, 284pp.
Feehan, J., 1980. Alluvial fan sediments from the old red sandstone of Devilsbit Mountain, County Tipperary. J. Earth. Sci. R. Dubl. Soc. 3 1980, 179–194  Retrieved 4 April 2013.
Feehan, J. with Edwards, D., 1980. Records of Cooksonia-type sporangia from late Wenlock strata in Ireland. Nature 287, 41–2  Retrieved 4 April 2013.
Feehan, J., 1982. The Old Red Sandstone rocks of the Slieve Bloom and north-eastern Slieve Bloom. Jl. Earth Sci. R. Dubl. Soc. 5, 11–30  Retrieved 4 April 2013
Edwards, D., Feehan, J. and Smith, D.G., 1983. A late Wenlock flora from County Tipperary. Bot. J. Linn. Soc. 86, 19–36  Retrieved 4 April 2013.
Feehan, J., 1984. Laois: an environmental history. Ballykilcavan Press, Stradbally, 552pp.
Feehan, J., 1984. The Loranths of Malawi. Nyala, Journal of the National Fauna Preservation Society of Malawi. 10(1), 5–24.
Feehan, J., 1985. Explosive flower opening in ornithophily: a study of pollination mechanisms in some Central African Loranthaceae. Bot. J. Linn. Soc. 90, 129–44  Retrieved 4 April 2013.
Feehan, J., 2000. Fraoch Mór Mháigh Rechet: The Great Heath of Maryborough 26pp.  Retrieved 4 April 2013
Feehan, J. with Rowlands, R.G., 2000. The ecological future of industrially milled cutaway peatlands in Ireland. In N.D. Boatman et al. (Eds.), Vegetation Management in Changing Landscapes, 263–270. The Association of Applied Biologists, Aspects of Applied Biology 58.
Feehan J., 2003. Farming in Ireland: History, Heritage and Environment. UCD Faculty of Agriculture, 606 pp.  Retrieved 4 April 2013
Feehan, J. with Dunne, L., 2003. Ireland's Mushroom Stones: Relics of a Vanished Lakeland. UCD, Department of Environmental Resource Management, 29pp. 
Feehan J., 2003. Divine earth. A Christian perspective on nature. Resurgence, 221, 6–9  Retrieved 4 April 2013
Feehan, J., 2003. Creation as Revelation: a new ethic towards the living world. In "A Just Society? Ethics and Values in Contemporary Ireland" edited by J. Scally. Dublin, The Liffey Press, pp. 93–102.  Retrieved 4 April 2013
Feehan, J. with Collier, M., 2003. Developing a field boundary evaluation and grading system in Ireland. Tearmann 3, 27–46.
Feehan, J., 2004. A Long-Lived Wilderness. The Future of the North Midland Peatlands. ERM in collaboration with the National Wetlands Park Committee, 45pp.
Feehan, J. and Rosse, A., 2005. An Atlas of Birr. Department of ERM at UCD in association with Offaly County Council.  Retrieved 4 April 2013
Feehan, J., 2005. Ireland's Environment. In C. Mollan (Ed.), Science and Ireland – Value for Society, 101–119.  Retrieved 4 April 2013
Feehan, J., 2005. Biodiversity Action Strategy for Offaly (Tullamore Declaration). Offaly County Council.  Retrieved 4 April 2013
Feehan, J., 2005. The Woodland Vegetation of Ireland, Past, Present and Future. Forest Perspectives: Irish Forestry 62 (1&2), 73–87 . Retrieved 4 April 2013
Feehan, J., 2007. The State of the Wild in Offaly. Offaly County Council.  Retrieved 4 April 2013
Feehan, J., 2007. Cuirrech Lifè. The Curragh of Kildare, Ireland. School of Biology and Environmental Science UCD in association with the Department of Defence.  Retrieved 4 April 2013
Feehan, J., 2007. The local environment as a resource in Community Tourism. Proceedings of the International Conference on Environmental Management and Rural Development, Samuel Tessedik College, Szarvas, Hungary.
Feehan, J., O'Donovan, G., Renou-Wilson, F. and Wilson, D., 2008. The Bogs of Ireland: An Introduction to the Natural, Cultural and Industrial Heritage of Irish Peatlands (Revised edition)]. UCD, School of Biology and Environmental Science.  Retrieved 4 April 2013. Original Edition (1996):  Retrieved 4 April 2013
Feehan, J., 2009. The Wildflowers of Offaly. Offaly County Council, 510 pp.  Retrieved 4 April 2013
Feehan, J., 2010a. The Singing Heart of the World. Creation, Evolution and Faith. The Columba Press, 204 pp.  Retrieved 4 April 2013. Reprinted by Orbis Books (2012), 223 pp.  Retrieved 4 April 2013
Feehan, J., 2010b. Farming and Food. In Susannah Kingston (ed.), Aspirations for Ireland – New Ways Forward, 160–169. Dublin, Columba Press.  Retrieved 4 April 2013
Feehan, J., with E. Bannon, J. Gaffey, C. Keena, J. McAdam, A. Pedlow and H. Sheridan, 2011. Biodiversity as a Resource in Agriculture and Rural Development. A National Rural Network Report [www.nrn.ie].
Feehan, J., 2011. Cruachán Éile in Uíbh Fhailí. Croghan, County Offaly, Ireland. Offaly County Council in association with the School of Agriculture and Food Science at UCD.  Retrieved 4 April 2013
Feehan, J., with Helen Sheridan and Damian Egan, 2012. The Grasses of Ireland. Teagasc, in association with the School of Agriculture, Food Science and Veterinary Medicine UCD.  Retrieved 4 April 2013
Feehan, J., 2011. The garden God walked in: a meditation on the spirit of trees. A Carnival of Learning. Essays to honour George Cunningham. Mount Saint Joseph, Cistercian Press, 65–73.  Retrieved 4 April 2013
Feehan, J., 2012. 'The failure of the potato and the Famine' and 'The Failure of the Potato: Baunreagh, Co. Laois,’ in J. Crowley, W.J. Smyth and M. Murphy (eds.), Atlas of the Great Irish Famine. Cork University Press.  Retrieved 4 April 2013
Feehan, J., 2013. 'The Geology of Laois and Offaly'. Offaly County Council, 400 pp.  Retrieved 27 April 2013
Feehan, J. (2014).  Cluain Mac Nóis i nDeilbne hEthra: The Landscape of Clonmacnoise, County Offaly, Ireland. Offaly County Council in association with Bord na Móna.  Retrieved 30 October 2020
Feehan, J. (2019). Clare Island (New Survey of Clare Island Volume 11). Dublin, Royal Irish Academy.  Retrieved 30 October 2020

References

External links 
Dr John Feehan's Amazon Author Page. Retrieved 4 April 2013
Offaly County Council: Programme of Biodiversity Events. Retrieved 4 April 2013
University College Dublin: Mushroom Stones. Retrieved 4 April 2013
YouTube Channel

21st-century Irish geologists
20th-century Irish botanists
Living people
1946 births
Members of the Royal Irish Academy
20th-century Irish geologists
21st-century Irish botanists